The LG1 is a modern 105 mm towed howitzer designed and produced by GIAT Industries (now Nexter group) of France.

Design
The LG1 howitzer is a 105 mm towed artillery piece that features both low weight and a high level of accuracy over long distances. Its lightweight construction gives the barrel a relatively short lifespan. The equivalent full charge (EFC) count is suggested to be approximately 7,500; however, during fire and practice, has yielded only around 1,500 EFCs. The gun was specifically designed for use by rapid deployment forces with attributes such as ruggedness, ease of operation and reduced weight. It can fire all NATO standard 105 mm ammunition up to a range of  using HE-ER G3 base bleed rounds.

Deployment
The gun has been used by the Belgian Army, Canadian Army, Colombian National Army, Indonesian Marine Corps, Singapore Army and the Royal Thai Army.

Current service version with Canadian artillery is the LG1 Mark II, of which 28 were purchased for the Royal Canadian Horse Artillery (RCHA). Giat supplied the first howitzers in 1996 and fielding was complete by November 1997.

Planned improvements
In August 2005, DEPRO (GVB) Incorporated - a Canadian defence firm, was selected by the Canadian Forces to improve their LG-1 guns with improvements ranging from new & better muzzle brake, new-designed spades for better stability during firing and larger tires to replace the small Pirelli tires (which were found to be inadequate for proper ground clearance while on the move). It is expected that this new set of improvements will give the LG-1 howitzers greater reliability and lifespan, and increase the safety margin for the crew.

Combat history
 Internal Conflict in Colombia
 War against Taliban in Afghanistan
 Counter Insurgency in Aceh

Operators

Current operators
 :

Royal Saudi Land Forces - ?

 :
Belgian Army - 14

 :
Canadian Army - 28

 :
Colombian Army - 20 LG1 MkIII operational since 2009. There were several problems with its buffers and trunnions, along with accuracy issues in its INS Keafott KN-4051 fire control system after a few rounds and constant use/real fire training, therefore the manufacturer included improvements in its buffer system, cradle and trunnions, also the FCS was changed for the Nexter BACARA FCS, tested and approved in 2014.

 :
Indonesian Marine Corps - 20

 :
Malaysian Army - 18

 :
Royal Thai Army - 24 Units
Royal Thai Marine Corps - 30 Units

Former operators
 :
Singapore Army - 39 (Phased out in 2008, replaced by the 155mm calibre SLWH Pegasus)

 :
 The former Forces Armées Rwandaises received some LG1s, after the Rwandan Civil War erupted in 1990.

See also
L118 light gun
M119 howitzer
Indian Field Gun
KH178 105 mm Towed Howitzer

References
Notes

105 mm artillery
Howitzers
Post–Cold War artillery of France
Nexter Systems